The Opole Voivodeship Sejmik is the regional legislature of the Voivodeship of Opole in Poland. It is a unicameral parliamentary body consisting of thirty councillors elected to a five-year term. The current chairperson of the assembly is Rafał Bartek of the MN.

The assembly elects the executive board that acts as the collective executive for the provincial government, headed by the voivodeship marshal. The current Executive Board of Opole is a coalition government between the Civic Coalition, German Minority party and the Polish People's Party. The current marshal is Andrzej Buła of the KO.

The assembly convenes within the Marshal's Office in Opole.

Districts 
Members of the Assembly are elected from five districts and serve five-year terms. Districts does not have the constituencies' formal names. Instead, each constituency has a number and territorial description.

Composition

1998

2002

2006

2010

2014

2018

See also 
 Polish Regional Assembly
 Opole Voivodeship

References

External links 
 
 

Opole
Assembly
Unicameral legislatures